Social security in Sweden is an aspect of the Swedish welfare system and consists of various social insurances handled by the National Agency for Social Insurance, and welfare provided based on need by local municipalities. Social security is the main conduit for redistribution of approximately 48% of the Swedish GDP in the form of taxed income.

Family policy 

Family policy for Swedish social security has undertaken a series of reforms. Initially, the policy aimed to encourage Swedish youth to marry and build families. The whole family policy consists of three parts: parental benefits, child allowance and public daycare.

Parental benefit 
Families receive up to a maximum of 480 days (16 months) paid parental leave, with an optional additional three months unpaid leave, and ten days of leave after the birth of a child for fathers. Regulations require each parent to take at least two months leave, but in reality, some fathers do not take leave at all. In this case the policy is implemented on a "use it or lose it" basis and the parental leave time will drop from 16 months to 14 months if unused by one parent. The leave can be used intermittently and for parts of days, but must be expended before the child is eight years of age. Parents are paid an approximate 80% of their pay for the first 390 days, and in the remaining 90 days, receive a flat rate of SEK 180 per day. The rate for unemployed parents is SEK 180 per day for the entirety of their parental leave. 

Parents receive up to a maximum of 120 days (four months) of leave to take care of sick children every year, in addition to a childcare allowance, to enable parents to stay at home and care for children with long-term illnesses.

Parental leave in Sweden is job-protected, meaning parents who take the leave have the right to return to the same employer and into the same or an adequate similar position.

Apart from paid leave, parents also receive a whole or partial reimbursement for hospital care, treatment and transportation related to childbirth.

Child allowance 
The child allowance in Sweden started from the General Child Allowance in 1948. Parents in Sweden receive cash benefits to ease the burden of raising children who are under 16 years old, . Generally, Swedish parents receive a flat rate child allowance of SEK 1050 per month for one child, which is tax-exempt. For example, a family with four children under sixteen years of age will receive SEK 4200 child allowance and SEK 1614 large family supplement per month, totaling SEK 5814 per month. This child allowance is financed by the central government's budget and parents do not need to apply for the allowance; it is paid automatically.

Apart from the child allowance, there are other allowances available for families with children. Families with children that pay over SEK 1400 for housing per month will receive a state-rent housing allowance, the level of which is determined by the number of children, the income of the family and the size and rent of the housing. But the income ceiling is set rather high, so that even a family with income well above average is entitled to receive house allowance.

For families with disabled children, they will also receive allowance for car, care and hiring personal assistants.

Public day care 
Public day care in Sweden are for children under seven years old. The daycare centers are run by local municipalities under the guidance of central government. Most municipal preschools are open ten to twelve hours a day to take care of children whose parents work full-time; there are also nighttime daycare centers for parents who work at night. "After the parents apply for placement at a preschool in the municipality where they live, the child is offered a vacancy based on that municipality's queue and admission rules." The reform in 2007 made daycare more affordable; EU/EEA citizens only need to pay a reduced fee for a full-time preschool.

Apart from public daycare, there are also cooperatives run by parents, private child care facilities and family daycare; minders are hired by local municipalities to take care of children in their house. However, public daycare is absolutely the majority. During 1965–1980, the number of child care facilities increased tenfold. Today, over three-quarters of children aged one to five go to publicly supported daycare centers.

Housing allowance 

Families with children and people below 29 years of age may be eligible to receive a housing allowance, .  The amount depends on income, the size of the family, housing costs and house size. At most it is 1,300 SEK.

Benefits for ill and disabled 

Working people are entitled to sick pay when ill. The first 14  days (except the first day off) are paid by the employer, the rest by Försäkringskassan. If an employee's ability to work is permanently reduced, disability payments may be made.

If an employee needs time-consuming assistance in everyday life to be able to work or study due to illness or disability, disability allowance or  can be obtained.
If a person has a substantial and permanent disability and needs assistance with mealtimes, washing, clothing and communicating with others, an allowance, can be provided to pay for an assistant. If a person has great difficulties in getting about on their own, or in using public transport due to a permanent disability, they can obtain an allowance to purchase a car, make alterations to a car, and to get a driving licence.

Support for the elderly 

If an employee has worked in Sweden and earned a taxable work income, they will be entitled to Swedish old age pension, at the earliest age of 61 years. The levels depend on income and how long the employee has worked. There is also a guarantee pension which one is entitled to if they have lived for at least three years in Sweden if they have had no or low income. The elderly can also receive housing supplements or maintenance support. The levels of these depend on one's needs.

Welfare 

If a person has no or low income, they can apply for welfare from the local municipality. The municipality will evaluate their economic situation to determine if they should receive welfare or not. The welfare should be enough to cover things like housing, food, clothing and telephone.

References 

 
Society of Sweden
Welfare in Sweden